Pristimantis sternothylax is a species of frog in the family Strabomantidae. It is found on the Cordillera de Huancabamba, Cordillera Occidental, Cerro Aypate, and Cerro Toronche in northern Peru as well as in the Loja Province in southern Ecuador. Its natural habitats are humid montane forest.

References

sternothylax
Amphibians of Ecuador
Amphibians of Peru
Amphibians described in 1993
Taxonomy articles created by Polbot